The 1944 Iowa Pre-Flight Seahawks football team represented the United States Navy pre-flight school at the University of Iowa as an independent during the 1944 college football season. In its third season, the team compiled a 10–1 record, outscored opponents by a total of 313 to 96, and was ranked No. 6 in the final AP Poll.

In June 1944, Jack Meagher—the head football coach at Auburn from 1934 to 1942—was assigned to replace Don Faurot as the pre-fight school's head coach. Faurot had been transferred to Monmouth College in January. Meagher was serving as a lieutenant commander in the Navy
and had been assigned previously to the technical training center in Norman, Oklahoma. Meagher's assistant coaches in 1944 included Bud Wilkinson (who later coached at Oklahoma), Steve Sinko, and Chuck Jaskwhich. Harvey Harman was the athletic director.

Schedule

Rankings

Roster

References

Iowa Pre-Flight
Iowa Pre-Flight Seahawks football seasons
Iowa Pre-Flight Seahawks football